Quinn Michael McNemar (February 20, 1900 – July 3, 1986) was an American psychologist and statistician. He is known for his work on IQ tests, for his book Psychological Statistics (1949) and for McNemar's test, the statistical test he introduced in 1947.

Life
McNemar was born in Greenland, West Virginia in 1900. He obtained his bachelor's degree in mathematics in 1925 from Juniata College, studied for his doctorate in psychology under Lewis Terman at Stanford University, and joined the faculty at Stanford in 1931. In 1942 he published The Revision of the Stanford–Binet Scale, the IQ test released in 1916 by Terman. By the time he retired from Stanford in 1965 he held professorships in psychology, statistics and education. He taught for another five years at the University of Texas before retiring to Palo Alto, where he died in 1986.

He was president of the Psychometric Society in 1951 and of the American Psychological Association in 1964.

References

1900 births
1986 deaths
American statisticians
Stanford University Department of Psychology faculty
University of Texas at Austin faculty
People from Grant County, West Virginia
Juniata College alumni
Stanford University alumni
Educators from West Virginia
Presidents of the American Psychological Association
20th-century American psychologists
Quantitative psychologists